Cumhuriyet (Laz language: Charnavati) is a quarter of the town Arhavi, Arhavi District, Artvin Province, Turkey. Its population is 855 (2021). Most inhabitants of the neighbourhood are ethnically Laz.

References

Arhavi District
Laz settlements in Turkey